Tin-Akoff is a department or commune of Oudalan Province in northern Burkina Faso. Its capital lies at the town of Tin-Akoff.

Towns and villages

References

Departments of Burkina Faso
Oudalan Province